This is a list of Dutch hip hop musicians.

Ali B - Born in Zaanstad of Moroccan descent, Ali B has been described as "perhaps the most popular rapper in the Netherlands".
Appa
Baas B
Bizzey
Boef
Brainpower
Brutus
Cilvaringz
Def Rhymz
D-Men, a commercially successful hiphop group from Diemen, known for their American type of beats and their catchy deliveries. D-Men received some media attention after releasing their mixtapes Straatremixes.
E-Life
Eddy Fort Moda Grog
Extince, one of the first Dutch language rappers to appear in the Dutch music charts.
Feis Ecktuh
Fouradi
Gers Pardoel
Hef
Kempi 
Kraantje Pappie
Lange Frans & Baas B are the core of the group D-Men
Lijpe
Lil' Kleine
Mr Probz
Murth The Man-O-Script
Negativ
Opgezwolle
The Opposites
Osdorp Posse - achieved commercial success and exerted great influence on the Dutch hip hop scene.
Patrick Tilon
Pete Philly and Perquisite
Postmen - from Rotterdam, this successful (live) band mostly sing in English and combines various music styles such as reggae and hip hop.
Raymzter
Ray Slijngaard
Remon Stotijn
Salah Edin
Tony Scott
Typhoon
U-Niq
Winne
Yes-R

References

Dutch

Dutch rappers